Talbot is a small lunar impact crater on the Mare Smythii, near the eastern limb of the Moon. It lies between a pair of larger, flooded craters, with Runge to the west and Haldane to the west-northwest. The crater is entirely surrounded by the dark lunar mare. It is a circular, bowl-shaped formation with an almost featureless interior floor. The outer rim has a slightly higher albedo than the surrounding terrain, but the floor is as dark as the mare.

References

 
 
 
 
 
 
 
 
 
 
 
 

Impact craters on the Moon